Darrow Brook is a  long tributary to West Branch French Creek that rises in Chautauqua County, New York and flows into Erie County, Pennsylvania.  It is classed as a 1st order stream on the EPA waters geoviewer site.

Course
Darrow Brook rises in the Town of Mina, New York in western Chautauqua County and flows north and northwest into Erie County, Pennsylvania to meet West Branch French Creek near Ashton Corners.

Watershed
Darrow Brook drains  of Erie Drift Plain (glacial geology).  The watershed receives an average of 46.8 in/year of precipitation and has a wetness index of 424.71.  The watershed is about 59% forested.

References

Rivers of New York (state)
Rivers of Pennsylvania
Tributaries of the Allegheny River
Rivers of Chautauqua County, New York
Rivers of Erie County, Pennsylvania